In algebra, the fundamental theorem of algebraic K-theory describes the effects of changing the ring of K-groups from a ring R to  or .

Description
Let  be the algebraic K-theory of the category of finitely generated modules over a noetherian ring R; explicitly, we can take , where  is given by Quillen's Q-construction. If R is a regular ring (i.e., has finite global dimension), then  the i-th K-group of R. This is an immediate consequence of the resolution theorem, which compares the K-theories of two different categories (with inclusion relation.)

For a noetherian ring R, the fundamental theorem states:
(i) .
(ii) .

The proof of the theorem uses the Q-construction. There is also a version of the theorem for the singular case (for ); this is the version proved in Grayson's paper.

See also 
basic theorems in algebraic K-theory

Notes

References 
Daniel Grayson, Higher algebraic K-theory II [after Daniel Quillen], 1976

Algebraic K-theory
Theorems in algebraic topology